Bobby is a 1973 Indian Hindi-language musical romance film, produced and directed by Raj Kapoor, and written by Khwaja Ahmad Abbas. The film stars Raj Kapoor's son, Rishi Kapoor, in his first leading role, opposite Dimple Kapadia in her debut role. The film became a blockbuster, the top-grossing Indian hit of 1973, the second-top-grossing hit of the 1970s at the Indian box office, and one of the top 20 highest-grossing Indian films of all time (when adjusted for inflation). It also became an overseas blockbuster in the Soviet Union, where it drew an audience of 62.6 million viewers, making it one of the top 20 biggest box office hits of all time in the Soviet Union. 

The film became a trend-setter. It was wildly popular and widely imitated. It introduced to Bollywood the genre of teenage romance with a rich-versus-poor clash as a backdrop. Numerous films in the following years and decades were inspired by this plot. Indiatimes Movies ranks Bobby amongst the 'Top 30 Must See Bollywood Films'. The film was remade in Persian as Parvaz dar Ghafas in 1980. Bobby was Dimple Kapadia's first and only film of the 70s era. As she left the film industry following her early marriage, before returning back to proper movies in the mid-80s till the present date.

Plot 
The story is about the love between two Bombay teenagers of different classes—Raja 'Raj' Nath (Rishi Kapoor), the son of a rich Hindu businessman Ram Nath (Pran), and Bobby Braganza (Dimple Kapadia), the daughter of a poor Goan Christian fisherman Jack Braganza (Prem Nath).

Raj returns from his boarding school. Upon his return, his parents throw a party to celebrate his birthday. Raj's former governess Mrs. Braganza (Durga Khote) comes by with her granddaughter Bobby to give him a present, but Raj's mother Sushma Nath (Sonia Sahni) ignores Mrs. Braganza, which leads her to leave the party with Bobby in a rush.

Raj opens his gifts the next day and finds Mrs. Braganza's gift, so he decides to meet her in person. Reaching there, Bobby opens the door for him, and it is love at first sight for him. During that visit, he mixes his book with Bobby's, so he goes to meet her at the library to exchange the books, and from that, both start their friendship. Raj and Bobby decide to go to see a movie, but find out it is a full house. Then Raj gets an idea to go to a party. At the party, Bobby sees Raj talking to Sushma's dance partner Nima (Aruna Irani) privately and thinks he is in love with her, so she breaks off her relationship before running off to Kashmir. However, Raj comes by to Kashmir and clears up the misunderstanding, prompting Bobby to resume her relationship with him. Despite Jack and Mrs. Braganza being very supportive of Raj and Bobby's relationship due to Raj's friendly nature, Raj learns that the matter is not taken kindly by Ram, who abhors the idea of his son falling in love with the daughter of a poor fisherman. Upon Raj's insistence, Ram invites Jack over to initiate talks of Raj and Bobby's relationship. But instead, a feud ignites when Ram insults Jack and accuses him of using Bobby's beauty and charm to trap Raj for his money; he even offered Jack a bribe of cash to stop Bobby from seeing Raj. Jack gets offended by this accusation and retaliates by insulting Ram before leaving in a huff with Bobby, forbidding her to hang out with Raj again. To ensure of Bobby's safety, Jack sends her and Mrs. Braganza to live in Goa.

Raj gets angry at Ram for driving Bobby away; this was further intensified when he learns that Ram intends to have him marry a mentally-challenged wealthy girl named Alka 'Nikki' Sharma (Farida Jalal) to establish business ties with her rich father Mr. Sharma (Pinchoo Kapoor) without even consulting Raj; even Sushma and Nima aren't supportive of the idea as well. On the advice from Nima (who sympathizes with Raj on the issue), Raj cuts off all ties to his father and drives off to Goa to reunite with Bobby, who runs away with him. As Sushma blames Ram for driving Raj away, the latter advertises a reward of $25,000 for anyone who can help find Raj. Upon spotting Raj and Bobby while seeing the reward on a local newspaper, a local greedy goon named Prem Chopra (Prem Chopra) decides that he wants the money so he and his goons kidnap Raj and Bobby. When the teens try to escape, Prem starts beating up Raj while having his goons to restrain Bobby. Eventually, Jack comes to the rescue by attacking Prem, who orders his goons to beat up Jack in retaliation. However, this was witnessed by an arriving Ram and the police, who furiously beat up and arrest Prem and his goons while Raj and Bobby escape. Deciding that they don't want their fathers to interfere in their relationship anymore, Raj and Bobby attempted to commit suicide by jumping over a waterfall after chewing out Ram for antagonizing Jack and starting the feud in the first place. However, a horrified Ram and Jack dive in and rescue both teens from being drowned.

Having realized the folly of the feud that almost drove both teens to death, a remorseful Ram and Jack agreed to end the feud by giving their blessings to Raj and Bobby's relationship, promising never to interfere with it again. With their relationships reconciled, the teens and their fathers happily head back home to their families.

Cast 

Raj Kapoor launched his second son Rishi Kapoor in this film; he wanted a new heroine to complement the young love story. Dimple Kapadia and Neetu Singh were auditioned for the role of Bobby Braganza, but Dimple was finally selected.

Production 
In an interview in 2012, Rishi Kapoor stated, "There was a misconception that the film was made to launch me as an actor. The film was made to pay the debts of Mera Naam Joker. Dad wanted to make a teenage love story and he did not have money to cast Rajesh Khanna in the film".

Filming 
Some scenes were shot in Gulmarg. One scene was shot in a hut in Gulmarg, which became famous as the 'Bobby Hut'. A few scenes towards the end of the movie were shot on Pune-Solapur highway near Loni Kalbhor where Raj Kapoor owned a farm.

Soundtrack 
The film's music was composed by the Laxmikant-Pyarelal duo. The lyrics were written by Anand Bakshi, Rajkavi Inderjeet Singh Tulsi, and Vithalbhai Patel. Lyrics penned by Anand Bakshi except where noted.

Box office 

In India, Bobby was the highest-grossing film of 1973, earning 11 crore. It was also the second-highest-grossing film at the Indian box office in the 1970s, second only to Sholay (1975). As of 2011, it is one of the top 20 highest-grossing films of all time in India.

Overseas, Bobby was very successful in the Soviet Union when it released there in 1975, due to Raj Kapoor's popularity in the country. Bobby drew 62.6million admissions at the Soviet box office, making it the second-best-selling film on the Soviet box office charts in 1975, the most popular Indian film of the 1970s, the second-biggest foreign film of the decade, the sixth-biggest box office hit of the decade, the second-most-viewed Indian film of all time (after Raj Kapoor's Awaara), the sixth-biggest foreign hit of all time, and one of the top 20 biggest box office hits of all time. The film's success launched Rishi Kapoor into an overnight movie star in the Soviet Union, much like Awaara had done for his father Raj Kapoor.

Similarly, the film was very successful in Southeast Asian countries such as Indonesia, Malaysia and Singapore. It was popular among non-Indian audiences in these countries, despite a lack of local language dubbing or subtitles upon its initial Malaysian release. It was among the most popular foreign films in Malaysia at the time, along with Bruce Lee films such as The Big Boss (1972). In China, the film was released in 1990.

Critical reception 
The Illustrated Weekly of India wrote upon release that despite a new style, "the story formula remains the same as ever". The review further noted that despite some gimmicks, the film's commercial appeal may be attributed to the "two fresh-faced, delightful youngsters", later praising the performances, including the lead pair who "act with natural ease and freshness", Premnath who is "outstanding as the expansive, volatile Mr. Braganza", but accused Pran of being typecast.

Awards 
21st Filmfare Awards:
Won
 Best Actor – Rishi Kapoor
 Best Actress – Dimple Kapadia (tied with Jaya Bhaduri for Abhimaan)
 Best Male Playback Singer – Narendra Chanchal for "Beshak Mandir Masjid"
 Best Art Direction – A. Rangaraj
 Best Sound Design – Allauddin Khan Qureshi

Nominated
 Best Film – Raj Kapoor
 Best Director – Raj Kapoor
 Best Supporting Actor – Prem Nath
 Best Supporting Actress – Aruna Irani
 Best Music Director – Laxmikant Pyarelal
 Best Lyricist – Anand Bakshi for "Hum Tum Ek Kamre Mein Band Ho"
 Best Lyricist – Anand Bakshi for "Main Shayar To Nahin"
 Best Lyricist – Vitthalbhai Patel for "Jhoot Bole Kava Kate"
 Best Male Playback Singer – Shailender Singh for "Main Shayar To Nahin"

1974 BFJA Awards:
 Best Male Playback Singer (Hindi Section) – Shailender Singh for "Main Shayar to Nahin"
 Best Audiographer (Hindi Section) – Alauddin Khan Qureshi

Controversy 
In his 2017 autobiography Khullam Khulla: Rishi Kapoor Uncensored, Rishi Kapoor revealed that he paid someone  to win him an award for Best Actor. Although it is inferred as Filmfare Award, he said in an interview that "I did not write a Filmfare Award [in the book]. I have not said any names. I have said I bought 'an award'".

See also 
100 Crore Club

Notes

References

External links 
 
 
 

1973 films
1970s Hindi-language films
1970s Urdu-language films
1970s romantic comedy-drama films
Indian romantic comedy-drama films
Films directed by Raj Kapoor
Indian romantic musical films
1970s romantic musical films
Films scored by Laxmikant–Pyarelal
R. K. Films films
Indian interfaith romance films
Films with screenplays by Khwaja Ahmad Abbas
Hindi films remade in other languages
1970s teen romance films
Urdu-language Indian films
Films set in Mumbai
Films set in Jammu and Kashmir
Films shot in Mumbai
Films shot in Jammu and Kashmir
1973 comedy films
1973 drama films
Indian teen romance films